The following is a list of directors of the Puerto Rico Federal Affairs Administration.

References

Cabinet-level officers of the Cabinet of Puerto Rico
Secretariat of Governance of Puerto Rico
Lists of office-holders in Puerto Rico